Chaw may refer to:

 Chaw (surname), a Cantonese romanization of the Chinese surname Cao
 Chaw (film), a 2009 Korean film
 Chewing tobacco, slang
 Chaw, a 2001 album by Chandrabindoo
 CHAW-FM, a country radio station based out of Little Current, Ontario